Bright B. Harris House is a historic home located at Greensburg, Decatur County, Indiana. It was built in 1871, and is a large -story, Italianate style brick dwelling. It has a low pitched gable and hipped roof, ashlar limestone foundation, and round arched windows.

It was added to the National Register of Historic Places in 2000.

References

External links

Houses on the National Register of Historic Places in Indiana
Italianate architecture in Indiana
Houses completed in 1871
Buildings and structures in Decatur County, Indiana
National Register of Historic Places in Decatur County, Indiana